Wan Kuzain bin Wan Kamal (born September 14, 1998) is an American professional soccer player who currently plays for MLS Next Pro side St. Louis City SC 2 and has played for the United States at the under-17 level.

Career

Early 

Born and raised by his Malaysian parents in Carbondale, Illinois, United States Wan Kuzain played Academy soccer with St. Louis Scott Gallagher. He was chosen to represent United States U-17 soccer team in 2013 and 2014 and also trained with Feyenoord Academy in 2015. Wan Kuzain signed with United Soccer League side Saint Louis FC on May 21, 2016. While there, he spent time on loan with the club's USL Premier Development League side Saint Louis FC U23.

Swope Park Rangers 

After spending time in the Sporting Kansas City academy, Wan Kuzain joined Kansas City's USL affiliate Swope Park Rangers in March 2017. That same year, he became the first player of Malaysian heritage to play in the USL, and to win the Western Conference.

Sporting Kansas City 

Kuzain signed with the Sporting Kansas City first team in April 2018. Kuzain scored his first MLS goal on June 3, 2018, against Minnesota United in a 4–1 victory.

Kuzain's contract option was declined by Kansas City following their 2020 season.

Rio Grande Valley FC Toros
On March 1, 2021, Kuzain signed with USL Championship side Rio Grande Valley FC Toros.

St. Louis City 2
On February 7, 2022, Kuzain signed with St. Louis City SC 2 in MLS Next Pro.

International 

Kuzain has trained with and represented the United States at the under-17 level in 2013 and 2014. He is eligible to represent both the United States and Malaysia. In November 2019, Kuzain was called up to train with the Malaysia under-22 national team ahead of the 2019 Southeast Asian Games. However, he was left out of the squad due to citizenship documentation issue.

Personal life 
His older brother, Wan Ahmad Fayhsal, is a Malaysian politician, while his younger brother, Wan Ahmad Kuzri is a US-based soccer player who was selected to join the provisional Malaysia national under-23 football team preparing for the 2022 AFF U-23 Championship.

Career statistics

Honors

Club
Swope Park Rangers
Western Conference: Winners (Playoffs) 2017
United Soccer League Cup: Runner-up 2017

Individual 

 USL Fans' Choice Goal of the Year: 2018
 USL Young Player of the Year: Finalist 2018

References

External links
 

1998 births
Living people
American soccer players
Saint Louis FC players
MLS Next Pro players
Sporting Kansas City II players
Sporting Kansas City players
Association football midfielders
Soccer players from Illinois
People from Carbondale, Illinois
USL League Two players
USL Championship players
American people of Malaysian descent
American people of Malay descent
Major League Soccer players
Homegrown Players (MLS)
Rio Grande Valley FC Toros players
St. Louis City SC 2 players